is a private university in Hamamatsu City, Shizuoka Prefecture Japan.

The predecessor of the school was founded in 1933, and it was chartered as a junior college in 1951. It became a four-year college 2004. It specializes in modern communications studies.

External links
 Official website 

Educational institutions established in 1933
Private universities and colleges in Japan
Universities and colleges in Shizuoka Prefecture
Buildings and structures in Hamamatsu
1933 establishments in Japan